Brundage may refer to:

 Brundage, Texas, an unincorporated community in the United States
 Brundage Mountain, an alpine ski area in west central Idaho, United States
 Brundage (surname)